Love Songs Drug Songs is the first major-label EP (and second overall) by American rock band X Ambassadors, released on May 7, 2013. It spawned one single: "Unconsolable".

Composition 
Shannon Carlin of Radio.com described the style of Love Songs Drug Songs as being "in the vein of old '60s soul, '90s R&B, and funk". Matt Collar of AllMusic stated, "Musically, X Ambassadors build a percussive mix of synthesizers, booming drums, and atmospheric guitar lines around vocalist Sam Harris' yearning, robust cry" while revealing "their love for mixing contemporary R&B inflections with a sweeping, '80s new wave sensibility".

According to X Ambassadors frontman Sam Harris, the album is inspired by the "bizarre" and "dreary" town of Ithaca that is "rainy and cold for 80 percent of the time". Nadia Noir of KROQ-FM noted the "sly irreverence and naughty hip-hop style sexual references in some of the songs" on the album. Speaking of the message of the EP, Harris stated, "I don’t know what we want to say. But we have to say something."

Critical reception 
Writing for AllMusic, Matt Collar rated Love Songs Drug Songs four stars out of five, calling it "a passionate, literate, and moving collection". In a very positive review, Robert Treves of Indie Current said the album "is packed full of triumphant, genre-blending tracks." He commented, "X Ambassadors [...] have really defined their own sound throughout this release."

Track listing

Personnel 
X Ambassadors
Sam Harris – vocals, guitar
Casey Harris – keyboard
Noah Feldshuh – guitar
Adam Levin – drums

Charts

References 

2013 EPs
X Ambassadors albums
Kidinakorner albums